Njan Kathorthirikkum is a 1986 Indian Malayalam-language film, directed by Rasheed Karapuzha. The film stars Rohini, Kundara Johnny, Nellikode Bhaskaran and Sabitha Anand in the lead roles. The film has musical score by Shyam.

Cast
Rohini
Kundara Johnny
Nellikode Bhaskaran
Sabitha Anand
Seema
Valsala Menon
Vijayaraghavan

Soundtrack
The music was composed by Shyam with lyrics by P. T. Abdurahiman.

References

External links
 

1986 films
1980s Malayalam-language films